Kamehameha I is a bronze sculpture depicting the founder and first ruler of the Kingdom of Hawaii of the same name by Thomas Ridgeway Gould, installed at the United States Capitol Visitor Center's Emancipation Hall, in Washington, D.C., as part of the National Statuary Hall Collection. A replica of the statue was given as a gift by the U.S. state of Hawaii in 1969.

See also
 1969 in art
 Kamehameha statues
 Kamehameha statue (original cast)

References

External links
 

2015 establishments in Washington, D.C.
Bronze sculptures in Washington, D.C.
Monuments and memorials in Washington, D.C.
National Statuary Hall Collection
Sculptures of men in Washington, D.C.